Boost is a 2016 Canadian drama film directed by Darren Curtis.

The film stars Nabil Rajo and Jahmil French as Hakeem and Anthony/"A-Mac", teenagers in the Park Extension neighbourhood of Montreal who work at Hakeem's uncle's car wash while simultaneously maintaining a sideline pursuit of passing on tips about valuable cars to the neighbourhood's gang of car thieves. One day, however, they decide to try their hands at undertaking an auto theft themselves. The film's cast also includes Fanny Mallette, Oluniké Adeliyi, Patrick Goyette and Théodore Pellerin.

The film was originally written to be about characters of South Asian background, but was rewritten in a Black Canadian context when Rajo and French were cast as the leads. The film was released concurrently in both the original English and dubbed French versions.

Accolades
The film received five Canadian Screen Award nominations at the 6th Canadian Screen Awards in 2018.

References

External links
 

2017 films
2017 drama films
English-language Canadian films
Canadian drama films
Films shot in Montreal
Films set in Montreal
Black Canadian films
2010s English-language films
2010s Canadian films